Peperomia rugosa is a species of plant in the genus Peperomia of the family Piperaceae. It is native to Ecuador.

References

rugosa
Flora of Ecuador